Jakobstads Tidning (abbr. JT) was a Swedish language regional newspaper in Finland published between 1898 and 2008.

History and profile
Jakobstads Tidning was first published on 21 December 1898 originally as a weekly newspaper. In 2000, JT became a daily newspaper, having previously been published six times a week.

Its headquarters was located in Jakobstad with local offices located in Kokkola and Nykarleby. In 1996 the paper had a circulation of 11,972 copies.  JT'''s circulation was 12,130 copies, most of which were sold in Jakobstad and surrounding regions in northern Ostrobothnia. 

In 2008 it merged with Österbottningen to form Österbottens Tidning. At the time of the merge, Jakobstads Tidning was the third largest Swedish-language newspaper in Finland in terms of circulation, behind Hufvudstadsbladet and Vasabladet''.

References

1898 establishments in Finland
2008 disestablishments in Finland
Defunct newspapers published in Finland
Defunct weekly newspapers
Mass media in Jakobstad
Daily newspapers published in Finland
Publications established in 1898
Publications disestablished in 2008
Swedish-language newspapers published in Finland
Weekly newspapers published in Finland